Durgam Cheruvu Metro Station is located on the Blue Line of the Hyderabad Metro.

History
It was opened on  20 March 2019.

The station

Structure
Durgam Cheruvu elevated metro station situated on the Blue Line of Hyderabad Metro.

Facilities
The stations have long staircases, elevators and escalators from the street level to the platform level which provide easy and comfortable access. Also, operation panels inside the elevators are installed at a level that can be conveniently operated by all passengers, including differently-abled and elderly citizens.

Station layout
Street Level This is the first level where passengers may park their vehicles and view the local area map.

Concourse level Ticketing office or Ticket Vending Machines (TVMs) is located here. Retail outlets and other facilities like washrooms, ATMs, first aid, etc., will be available in this area.

Platform level  This layer consists of two platforms. Trains takes passengers from this level.

Entry/exit

See also

References

Hyderabad Metro stations